Radio Capris is a radio station located in the city of Koper, Slovenia. It can be heard from Slovenia and Triveneto on the frequency of 91.7 MHz.

References

External links
 

Radio stations in Slovenia
International broadcasters